The elections for the 5th convocation of the People's Assembly of Abkhazia were held in two rounds on 10 and 24 March 2012.

Background
This was the first parliamentary election since the August 2008 war and the subsequent diplomatic recognition of Abkhazia by Russia, Nicaragua, Nauru, Venezuela, Vanuatu and Tuvalu.

On 22 February, President Alexander Ankvab survived an assassination attempt as his motorcade came under attack on the road from Gudauta to Sukhumi. Though he survived, two bodyguards were killed. Ankvab blamed "mafia, criminal groups" and the "political circles" around them for the attack. The Russian Foreign Ministry said that it was an attempt to destabilise the country's political situation prior to the election.

Parties
Candidates could be nominated by initiative groups and by officially registered political parties (in at most a third of all constituencies, that is 11).

Candidates
In total, 156 candidates were nominated. 35 candidates were nominated by a political party and 126 by an initiative group (with some overlap). Of the candidates nominated by a political party, 11 were nominated by United Abkhazia, 11 by the Forum for the National Unity of Abkhazia, 7 by the Communist Party and 6 by the Party for the Economic Development of Abkhazia.
The Central Electoral Commission approved the registration of 151 candidates. Of these, 3 withdrew their candidacy before election day. Of the remaining 148 candidates, 125 were ethnically Abkhaz, nine Armenian, eight Russian, two Greek, two Georgian, one Ossetian and one Kabardin. 16 were female.

Campaign
On 6 March, the Russian Community of the Republic of Abkhazia called upon voters in constituencies 7, 11 and 23 to vote for the Russian candidates Natalya Kayun, Andrei Kulikov and Viktor Vasilev, the first two of which had previously been nominated by United Abkhazia.

Monitors
There were 46-100 international observers from nine countries. According to the CEC, the monitors would be from Russia (from governmental and non-governmental organisations), the Commonwealth of Independent States, South Ossetia, Transnistria and Nagorno-Karabakh. Other states whose monitors were invited but had not confirmed attendance are: Venezuela, Nicaragua, Nauru and Tuvalu. Georgia steadfastly refused to observe the election on the premise that they claim Abkhazia is under "de facto Russian occupation" and that Georgian refugees who fled Abkhazia (by some accounts up to 50% of the population) are ineligible to vote.

Results

First round
There were 174 pollings stations. First round turnout was 44.5%. Only 13 constituencies achieved a majority to choose an MP; the other 22 constituencies would face a run-off.

Second round
Second round turnout was 46.21% in 20 constituencies. Of the 40 candidates for the 20 seats in the second round three of nine incumbents held on to their seats. Amongst the 20 members were three MPs from People’s Unity Forum of Abkhazia, two from United Abkhazia the 15 from civic initiative groups. The result will be finalised when approved by a court. Amongst minority representatives, Vagharshak Kosyan and Robert Yalyan were joined by journalist Levon Galustyan to have a total of three Armenian MPs, according to Khachik Minosyan, the Chairman of the Union of Abkhazia Armenians. Galustyan said the election was flawless and praised his fellow Armenian challenger from district 20.

Rerun in constituency no. 1
The first round of the election in constituency no. 1 was declared invalid because the turnout had failed to surpass the threshold of 25%. On election day, the Constituency Election Commission originally declared that turnout had been 25.01%. However, after a complaint by two candidates that a mistake had been made in the calculation of the turnout, the Central Election Commission ordered the Constituency Election Commission to recheck the protocols. The corrected turnout was found to be 24.9%, invalidating the election.

On 19 March the Central Election Commission announced that the rerun would be held on 6 May. Four out of seven of the original candidates were nominated again: Daur Achugba, Roland Gamgia, Yekaterina Glazkova and Talikh Khvatish. They were joined by one new candidate, businessman Beslan Eshba. All were successfully registered. Eshba won the rerun with 1932 out of 3413 votes (56.61%), against 782 for Gamgia, 520 for Khvatysh, 47 for Achugba and 43 for Glazkova. Turnout was significantly higher than during the original election, at 44.94%.

Rerun in constituency no. 21

On 29 March, the Supreme Court of Abkhazia invalidated the election in constituency no. 21 and ordered a rerun. The original count had given Aida Ashuba a slim first round majority of 401 votes out of 795 (50.44%), but after a complaint by the campaign team of runner up Valeri Kvarchia, the election commission of precinct 1 held a recount. In the recount, 46 more ballots were found to be invalid, causing Ashuba's vote share to fall below 50% and making a second round run-off between Ashuba and Kvarchia necessary. Ashuba then issued a complaint with the Central Election Commission as his observers had not been present during the recount. The Central Election Commission agreed with the complaint and requested the precinct and constituency election commissions to uphold the original count. When the local election commission refused to comply, the Central Election Commission brought the matter to the Supreme Court.

During the court proceedings it was established that contrary to election law, the ballot bag had not been sealed, and that during the recount, supporters of Kvarchia as well as Security Council and Interior Ministry officials had been present. The representative of the office of the Procecutor General argued that this constituted a breach of election law, that the irregularities in the transport and storage of election ballots meant that determining the correct election result was now impossible, and that both voting protocols should be declared invalid.

The repeat election was set for 20 May, with the nomination period running from 31 March to 20 April and the registration period from 20 April to 10 May. Both Aida Ashuba and Valeri Kvarchia were nominated again by initiative groups. They were joined by Givi Adleiba, who had not originally participated. All three candidates were successfully registered. The rerun saw a much higher turnout than the original election of 1271 from a total of 1770 registered voters (71.8%). No candidate managed to score a first round victory in the repeat election as Kvarchia received 573 votes, Ashuba 502 and Adleiba 159 (37 votes being invalid). In the second round on 4 June, Kvarchia defeated Ashuba with 679 votes against 623, out of a total of 1334 — there had been 1779 registered voters.

Overview

The following table presents an overview of all the candidates, the votes they received in the first round, the second round run-off winners and the reruns.

Reactions
The head of the Central Election Commission, Batal Tabagua, said that since voter turnout exceeded the 25% threshold the election was declared valid. He also added the election was "calm and normal." The CEC spokesman added that "there weren’t observed any violations that could affect the people’s free will." The Ministry of Foreign Affairs responded to claims of the election being "illegitimate" by NATO, the U.S. Department of State and its embassy in Georgia, the EU delegation to Georgia, PACE co-reporters on Georgia and the Foreign Ministries of Georgia, Latvia, Lithuania, Estonia, Poland and Azerbaijan as them having "not see[n] fit to support their conclusions by any legal or factual evidence. Such conclusions could have been made only from direct observation of preparation and conduct of voting in the elections to the People's Assembly of the Republic of Abkhazia. However, none of the above-mentioned countries and organisations sent their observers here, though the Central Election Commission of Abkhazia would have definitely provided them everything necessary for quality monitoring of the voting process." It also added that all the observers, including from the UN-member states of Russia, Venezuela, Nicaragua and Tuvalu, as well as the European parliament and international NGOs confirmed the election was in line with international democratic standards and that "people of Abkhazia recognised the legitimacy of voting procedures in their state long ago."

 - Georgia called the election "illegitimate" under their claim that Abkhazia was under Russian "occupation" after the 2008 Russia Georgia war.
A statement from the Tbilisi, Georgia-based government of the Autonomous Republic of Abkhazia read: "Occupied Abkhazia is not a subject under international law. Therefore, elections held there can’t be regarded in the light of international law." Levan Tevzaia, a representative of the organisation said: "The de facto parliamentary elections are under way in an occupied region of Georgia, from where the absolute majority of the population is displaced; hence, these so-called elections do not have a legal framework. It is an absolute fiction. The region is actually ruled by Russia."
 - Sergei Markov, a member of the Public Chamber said that the election should give Abkhazia a legitimate parliament so as the country's problems. He added that "a democratic society is developing in Abkhazia. The republic is the most democratic state in the Caucasus and can set the pattern for Georgia."
 - The embassy in Georgia said it does not recognise the election.

References 

2012
parliamentary